Cel was the Etruscan goddess of the earth. On the Etruscan calendar, the month of Celi (September) is likely named for her. Her Greek counterpart is Gaia and her Roman is Tellus.

In Etruscan mythology, Cel was the mother of the Giants. A bronze mirror from the 5th century BC depicts a theomachy in which Celsclan, "son of Cel," is a Giant attacked by Laran, the god of war. In Greek, "giant" comes from a word meaning "born from Gaia". Another mirror depicts anguiped Giants in the company of a goddess, possibly Cel, whose lower body is formed of vegetation.

In a sanctuary near Lake Trasimeno were found five votive bronze statuettes, some male and some female, dedicated to her as Cel Ati, "Mother Cel".  The inscription on each reads  "I [belong to, have been given] to Cel the mother, here [in this sanctuary]."

Cel appears on the Liver of Piacenza, a bronze model of a liver marked for the Etruscan practice of haruspicy. She is placed in House 13.

References

Etruscan goddesses
Earth goddesses